The Rural Municipality of Piney is a rural municipality in southeastern Manitoba, Canada, along the border with Minnesota in the United States.

Geography
According to Statistics Canada, the municipality has a land area of 2,433.77 km2. It is bordered by the rural municipalities of Stuartburn, La Broquerie, and Reynolds, as well as the Buffalo Point 36 Indian reserve and an unorganized part of the province (Division No. 1, Unorganized, Manitoba).

The municipality borders Roseau County in the U.S. state of Minnesota. There are three international border crossings in Piney, the most of any Manitoba municipality: Pinecreek–Piney, Roseau–South Junction, and Warroad–Sprague Border Crossings.

A minority but large part of Sandilands Provincial Forest is located here, as is a small part of Northwest Angle Provincial Forest. Also, Cat Hills Provincial Forest and Wampum Provincial Forest are both entirely located here, but these two forests are relatively tiny in size.

Communities
 Badger
 Carrick
 Menisino
 Middlebro
 Piney
 St. Labre
 Sandilands
 South Junction
 Sprague
 Vassar
 Wampum
 Woodridge

Demographics

In 2001, there were 690 housing units at an average density of 0.28/km2. 2.4% of the people in the municipality are members of a visible minority.

Of the 695 households, 24.5% had a couple (married or common law) with children, 38.1% had a couple without children, 26.6% had one person, and 10.1% had another household type. The average household size was 2.43 and the average family size was 3.48.

In the municipality the population was spread out, with 18.0% under the age of 15, 11.0% from 15 to 24, 22.3% from 25 to 44, 29.1% from 45 to 64, and 19.9% 65 or older. The median age was 44.2 years. For every 100 females there were 113.9 males.  For every 100 females age 15 and over, there were 103.6 males.

The median household income was $32,237 and the median family income was $39,525. Males had a median income of $23,726 versus $19,268 for females. The per capita income for the municipality was $10,043.

Climate

Gallery

See also
 Pinecreek–Piney Border Crossing
 Roseau–South Junction Border Crossing
 Warroad–Sprague Border Crossing

References

External links
Official website
Map of Piney R.M. at Statcan

Rural municipalities in Manitoba